The Other Half is a 1919 American drama film directed by King Vidor. Produced by the Brentwood Corporation, the film starred Vidor’s wife Florence Vidor and featured comedienne Zasu Pitts.

The picture is the third of four Christian Science-influenced films that represent a brief phase in Vidor’s output,  championing the superiority of self-healing through moral strength and supplemented by the benefits of rural living.
In February 2020, the film was shown at the 70th Berlin International Film Festival, as part of a retrospective dedicated to King Vidor's career.

Plot
As described in a film magazine, Captain Donald Trent (Meredith), whose father owns the mills that are the chief industry of the small town, returns from service in the American Expeditionary Forces in France with a clear vision of humanity and humanity's rights, deciding to start work in the plant at the bottom. With him returns Corporal Jimmy Davis (Butler) who takes back his old job at the mill. Donald's sweetheart Katherine (Vidor) comes around, as does Jennie Jones, The Jazz Kid (Pitts), making up the quartet. Then Trent Sr. (Allen) dies and Donald becomes manager of the mills, quickly losing his new found views. After an accident at the mills blinds Jimmy, Donald refuses to see him. Katherine, through the editorial pages of a newspaper she has purchased, reaches Donald's heart with her columns, and brings the quartet back together in unity and happiness.

Cast

 Florence Vidor as Katherine Boone
 Charles Meredith as Donald Trent
 ZaSu Pitts as Jennie Jones, The Jazz Kid	
 David Butler as Cpl. Jimmy Davis
 Alfred Allen as J. Martin Trent
 Frances Raymond as Mrs. Boone
 Hugh Saxon as James Bradley
 Thomas Jefferson as Caleb Fairman

Footnotes

References
Baxter, John. 1976. King Vidor. Simon & Schuster, Inc. Monarch Film Studies. LOC Card Number 75-23544.
Durgnat, Raymond and Simmon, Scott. 1988. King Vidor, American. University of California Press, Berkeley. 
Gustafsson, Fredrik. 2016. King Vidor, An American Romantic La furia umana. LFU/28 Winter 2016. http://www.lafuriaumana.it/index.php/61-archive/lfu-28/548-fredrik-gustafsson-king-vidor-an-american-romantic  Retrieved June 4, 2020.

External links

1919 films
1919 drama films
Silent American drama films
American black-and-white films
American silent feature films
Films directed by King Vidor
Film Booking Offices of America films
1910s American films
1910s English-language films